Nawal Kishore Rai (1 January 1960 – 16 April 2022) was a leader of Janata Dal (United) from Bihar. He served as member of the Lok Sabha representing Sitamarhi (Lok Sabha constituency). He was elected to 10th, 11th and 13th Lok Sabha.  He was married to Smt. Ram Dulari Rai and lived in Sitamarhi, Bihar, India.

Positions held
 1989  - General-Secretary, Yuva Janata Dal, Bihar
 1991  - Elected to 10th Lok Sabha
 1991-93  - Member, Committee on Government Assurances; Vice-President, Yuva Janata Dal
 1991 onwards - Member, National Youth Programme
 1991-96  - Member, Consultative Committee, Ministry of Railways
 1993 onwards - President, Yuva Janata Dal
 1994-96 - Convenor, Sub-Committee of Standing Committee, Ministry of Industry
 1996 - Re-elected to 11th Lok Sabha (2nd term)
 1996-97 - Chairman, House Committee
 1999 - Re-elected to 13th Lok Sabha (3rd term)
 1999-2000 -  Member, Committee on Railways; Member, Joint Committee on Offices of Profit.

Other information
 Took active part in J.P. Movement during 1974-77 and was jailed for participating in a movement organized by Karpoori Thakur.
 participated in Kisan Movement, 1980-81; organized movement against Bihar Press Bill.
 1983-84 and a students movement in Sitamarhi District, Bihar.

Death
Rai died on 16 April 2022 in Delhi.

References

1960 births
2022 deaths
India MPs 1991–1996
People from Sitamarhi district
India MPs 1996–1997
India MPs 1999–2004
Lok Sabha members from Bihar
Janata Dal (United) politicians
Janata Dal politicians